Klenova Peak is the sharp peak rising to 2300 m on the southwest side of Vinson Massif in Sentinel Range, Ellsworth Mountains in Antarctica.  It has partly ice-free south slopes, and surmounts upper Nimitz Glacier to the southwest and its tributary Cairns Glacier to the northeast.

The peak is named after Maria Klenova (1898-1976), a Russian marine geologist who took part in the First Soviet Antarctic Expedition in 1955–57, becoming the first woman scientist to have carried out research in Antarctica.

Location
US mapping in 1961 and 1988.

See also
 Mountains in Antarctica

Maps
 Vinson Massif.  Scale 1:250 000 topographic map.  Reston, Virginia: US Geological Survey, 1988.
 Antarctic Digital Database (ADD). Scale 1:250000 topographic map of Antarctica. Scientific Committee on Antarctic Research (SCAR). Since 1993, regularly updated.

References
 Klenova Peak. SCAR Composite Gazetteer of Antarctica.
 Bulgarian Antarctic Gazetteer. Antarctic Place-names Commission. (details in Bulgarian, basic data in English)

External links
 Klenova Peak. Copernix satellite image

Ellsworth Mountains
Bulgaria and the Antarctic
Mountains of Ellsworth Land